The Lopburi River is a tributary of the Chao Phraya River in central Thailand. It splits from the Chao Phraya river at Tambon Bang Phutsa, Singburi. Passing through Tha Wung district and the town of Lopburi, it enters the Chao Phraya together with the Pa Sak River at the town of Ayutthaya.

Rivers of Thailand